Ichnusotricha is a monotypic genus of gastropods belonging to the family Hygromiidae. The only species is  Ichnusotricha berninii.

The species is found in Corsica.

References

Hygromiidae